"The Stan and Guy Show" was a Pittsburgh-based talk show airing from 10 AM until 2 PM on ESPN Radio 1250. It is hosted by Stan Savran and Guy Junker. The show replaced "The Junker and Crow Show" on ESPN Radio 1250's lineup. Frequent topics on the program include the Pittsburgh Pirates, Pittsburgh Steelers, and Pittsburgh Penguins.

Once a month the show broadcasts from Morton's The Steakhouse in downtown Pittsburgh with a "Lunch With the Legends" theme. Recent guests have included Bill Mazeroski, Franco Harris, Jack Ham, Steve Blass, Pierre LaRouche, Steve Levy, Barry Melrose and Mike ((Greenburg)) and Mike ((Golic)). The show also features a "Sportsbeat" hour from Noon to 1 PM on Thursdays that replicates the television show Stan and Guy did for Fox Sports Net from 1991 to 2003.

In June the duo held their first annual "Stan and Guy Golf Classic" at Churchill Valley Country Club with proceeds going to the V Foundation.

Stan Savran also does Pittsburgh Pirates and Penguins pregame shows for FSN and Guy Junker is the sports director of WTAE-TV (ABC) in Pittsburgh.

In October 2006, the show became available via ESPN Podcast.

On September 24, 2010 ESPN Radio 1250 announced that they would be switching to Radio Disney and would cease carrying local personalities on their station.  The show was cancelled.

References 

American sports radio programs